Redman is an extinct town in Scott County, in the U.S. state of Missouri.

Redman was founded in the 1910s, taking its name from Robert Redman, an early settler.

References

Ghost towns in Missouri
Former populated places in Scott County, Missouri